Kevin Čustović (born 3 February 2000) is a Swedish professional footballer, who plays as a midfielder or right-back for League of Ireland Premier Division club Cork City on loan from Danish 1st Division club Vejle Boldklub.

Career

Early years
Čustović started playing for Västerås IK. He then went to Gideonsbergs IF before joining Skiljebo SK. He later moved to IFK Västerås, where he despite his young age, made 26 appearances and scored nine goals for the club in the Swedish Division 4.

Västerås SK
On 3 July 2017 it was confirmed, that 17-year old Čustović had joined Västerås SK and would be a part of the clubs Division 1 team. Čustović made nine appearances in 2017 for Västerås, in addition to a few games for the U-21 team.

In the first half of the 2018 season, Čustović made six appearances for Västerås, including two cup games. To gain some more experience, Čustović was loaned out in September 2018 to his former club, Skiljebo SK. The deal included, that Čustović could play for both clubs until the end of the year.

In April 2019, Čustović was loaned out again, this time to Enköpings SK in the Swedish Division 2. In August 2019, he was loaned out to Division 1 club Nyköpings BIS. He returned to Västerås for the 2020 season.

In February 2021, Čustović suffered from heart problems during a training camp in Spain with Västerås. However, he had a good season with Västerås, playing 20 league games during the year, crowned with a contract extension of 1.5 years in June 2020.

Vejle
On 5 July 2021 it was confirmed, that 21-year old Čustović had signed a four-year contract with newly promoted Danish Superliga club Vejle Boldklub.

Čustović made his debut in the first Danish Superliga game of the season, on 18 July 2021, against Randers FC, where he was in the starting lineup. However, he was pulled off the pitch by manager Carit Falch after just 35 minutes. Vejle was down 0-2 and after the game, Falch explained that "there were some things he just didn't understand when the game was going so fast" and that "it was to protect the team". On 11 August 2022 it was confirmed, that Čustović had been loaned out to Superettan club Örebro SK for the rest of 2022.

On 30 January 2023, Čustović signed for League of Ireland Premier Division club Cork City on loan for the 2023 season.

References

External links

2000 births
Living people
Swedish footballers
Swedish expatriate footballers
Association football forwards
Ettan Fotboll players
Division 2 (Swedish football) players
Division 4 (Swedish football) players
Danish Superliga players
Västerås IK Fotboll players
Enköpings SK players
Nyköpings BIS players
Vejle Boldklub players
Örebro SK players
Cork City F.C. players
Swedish expatriate sportspeople in Denmark
Expatriate men's footballers in Denmark
Swedish expatriate sportspeople in Ireland
Expatriate association footballers in the Republic of Ireland